The Northern Kanto proportional representation block (北関東比例ブロック, Kantō hokubu hirei burokku) is one of eleven proportional representation (PR) blocks for the House of Representatives in the Diet of Japan. It consists of the northern part of the Kanto region, and consists of the prefectures of Gunma, Tochigi, Saitama and Ibaraki. Proportional voting blocks were first introduced in the 1996 General Election. The block elects 19 members to the House of Representatives.

See also
List of districts of the House of Representatives of Japan

References 

Regions of Japan
P